Paullu Inca (1518–1549) was a puppet Sapa Inca installed by the Spaniards after the previous Sapa Inca, Manco Inca Yupanqui, rebelled against the Spanish and established the small Neo-Inca State in Vilcabamba.

Biography
He was the son of Huayna Capac and half brother of Ninan Cuyochi, Huáscar, Atahualpa, Túpac Huallpa and Manco Inca Yupanqui.

In the early part of Manco Inca's reign, he was a strong supporter of Manco Inca, who ordered him and the high priest Villac Umac to accompany Diego de Almagro's expedition to Chile in 1535. Both awaited Almagro at Tupiza and there delivered to him a large quantity of gold from the Chilean tribute. At Jujuy, Villac Umac escaped and returned to Peru, during his journey fomenting a general revolution against the Spaniards, at the instigation of Manco Inca.

When Almagro's expedition returned, Manco Inca had Cusco under siege. The return of Diego de Almagro and his several hundred troops precipitated the end of the siege. Paullu Inca sided with the Spanish, and was recompensed for his services by receipt of the property of his brother Huáscar.

Paullu was crowned Sapa Inca after the departure of Manco Inca.

After Almagro took possession of Cuzco and captured the brothers Pizarro, Paullu, at the head of the Incas, aided Almagro to defeat the forces of Alonso de Alvarado at Abancay. Paullu also took part in the battle of Salinas at the head of 6,000 Incas, and in 1539 he accompanied Gonzalo Pizarro in the war against the Incas of Charcas.

Charles V recommended him to the viceroy Blasco Núñez Vela, and wrote to Paullu a letter expressing his gratitude. In 1543 he was baptized under the name of Cristóbal. In contrast to most of his brothers, he died a peaceful death in 1549. He was buried in the church that he built in Cuzco.

Descendants 
Paullu had numerous children outside his marriage. All of them were left out of his testament despite a previous royal decree that had legitimized a large number of them, putting an end to the title of "Sapa Inca". One of his sons, named Carlos Inca, would serve as a spiritual successor under the title of Regent of Cuzco serving as head in religious ceremonies, participating in the trade of Coca leaves and in the hiring of Indians to work on the mines of Potosí.

Paullu's grandson, and Carlos Inca's son; Melchor Carlos Inca inherited his father's properties at age 11 in 1582, after the former's death. He lived in Cuzco and served as a Knight of Santiago, as did his son Juan Melchor Carlos Inca, one of Melchor's 4 illegitimate children.

Juan Melchor moved to Spain and died travelling to Barcelona alongside a military company in 1630, leaving no descendants.

References

1518 births
1549 deaths
Inca emperors
16th-century monarchs in South America